The 1996 World Field Archery Championships were held in Kranjska Gora, Slovenia.

Medal summary (Men's individual)

Medal summary (Women's individual)

Medal summary (Men's Team)

Medal summary (Women's Team)

Medal summary (Juniors)
No Junior Events at this championships.

References

E
1996 in Slovenian sport
International sports competitions hosted by Slovenia 
Archery competitions in Slovenia
World Field Archery Championships